is a Japanese voice actress. She was born in Aoyama, Mie, and currently resides in Iga, Mie. 

Mizuta replaced long-time voice actress Nobuyo Ōyama as the voice of Doraemon, starting with the 2005 TV series. She won the Kids/Family Award at the 4th Seiyu Awards. She formerly appeared in the Pokémon Best Wishes series in Japan, voicing Ash's Tepig. She was at one time represented by Kenji Utsumi's Ken Production.

Filmography

Anime

Film

Video games

Dubbing
Sin (Kassie (Kerry Washington))

Live-action
 As the Gods Will (Daikyokushō Matryoshka) (voice)

References

External links
  at TV Asobi (TV Asahi)  
 

1974 births
Living people
Voice actresses from Mie Prefecture
Japanese video game actresses
Japanese voice actresses
Ken Production voice actors
Aoni Production voice actors
20th-century Japanese actresses
21st-century Japanese actresses